Tāhunanui is one of the suburbs of Nelson, New Zealand. It lies between Port Nelson and Nelson Airport and is the site of the main beach for Nelson with a shoreline on the Tasman Bay / Te Tai-o-Aorere.

Geography

Tāhunanui Beach

Tāhunanui Beach is Nelson's main beach. It lies on the shore of Tasman Bay / Te Tai-o-Aorere on the northern edge of a peninsula which stretches west from Tāhunanui. The beach is notable for its long shallow slope, and for this reason is extremely popular with local swimmers, as the water is generally calm and warmed by the sun.

Oyster Island

Oyster Island is an island reserve located offshore from Tāhunanui.

Parks

Tāhunanui has several local parks: Annesbrook Youth Park, Bolt Reserve, Burrell Park, Centennial Park, Paddys Knob Reserve, Tāhunanui Recreation Reserve, Tasman Heights Reserve and Tosswill Reserve.

There is also an Airport Peninsula Esplanade on the way into Nelson Airport.

Demographics

Tāhunanui had a population of 2,745 at the 2018 New Zealand census, an increase of 156 people (6.0%) since the 2013 census, and an increase of 252 people (10.1%) since the 2006 census. There were 1,206 households. There were 1,374 males and 1,371 females, giving a sex ratio of 1.0 males per female. The median age was 41.8 years (compared with 37.4 years nationally), with 453 people (16.5%) aged under 15 years, 549 (20.0%) aged 15 to 29, 1,245 (45.4%) aged 30 to 64, and 501 (18.3%) aged 65 or older.

Ethnicities were 86.3% European/Pākehā, 15.5% Māori, 2.3% Pacific peoples, 5.1% Asian, and 2.1% other ethnicities (totals add to more than 100% since people could identify with multiple ethnicities).

The proportion of people born overseas was 18.7%, compared with 27.1% nationally.

Although some people objected to giving their religion, 57.8% had no religion, 29.3% were Christian, 0.3% were Hindu, 0.2% were Muslim, 1.4% were Buddhist and 3.0% had other religions.

Of those at least 15 years old, 336 (14.7%) people had a bachelor or higher degree, and 507 (22.1%) people had no formal qualifications. The median income was $27,300, compared with $31,800 nationally. The employment status of those at least 15 was that 1,098 (47.9%) people were employed full-time, 357 (15.6%) were part-time, and 78 (3.4%) were unemployed.

References

Suburbs of Nelson, New Zealand
Populated places in the Nelson Region
Populated places around Tasman Bay / Te Tai-o-Aorere
Beaches of New Zealand
Landforms of the Nelson Region